Petipa is a crater on Mercury.  Its name was adopted by the International Astronomical Union (IAU) in 2012. It is named for the French and Russian choreographer and dancer Marius Petipa.

Petipa has an extensive ray system.

References

Impact craters on Mercury